Rifet Kapić (born 3 July 1995) is a Bosnian professional footballer who plays as a midfielder for Kryvbas Kryvyi Rih.

He started his professional career at Varnsdorf, before joining Gorica in 2016. Two years later, Kapić moved to Grasshoppers, who loaned him to Sheriff Tiraspol in 2018 and to Sarajevo in 2019. Later that year, he signed with SC Paderborn, who also loaned him to Sheriff. In 2021, Kapić returned to Sarajevo.

Club career

Early career
Kapić started playing football with his hometown club Krajina Cazin. He then spent brief period of time in the academy of Sarajevo, after which he played for Istra 1961's youth team.

Kapić made his professional debut playing for Czech club Varnsdorf in 2015.

In February 2016, Kapić signed a three-year contract with Gorica. On 29 April, he scored his first professional goal against Zavrč.

Grasshoppers
On 12 January 2018, Kapić moved to Swiss side Grasshopper Club Zürich on a four-year deal for an undisclosed transfer fee. He made his competitive debut for the club in a 3–1 win over Sion on 4 February.

In June 2018, he was sent on a season-long loan to Moldovan outfit Sheriff Tiraspol.

In February 2019, he was loaned to Bosnian club Sarajevo until the end of season.

SC Paderborn
On 1 June 2019, Kapić signed a three-year contract with Bundesliga club SC Paderborn.

In August 2020, he joined Sheriff Tiraspol on loan for a second time with them, also securing an option to sign him permanently.

In June 2021, Kapić terminated his contract with the club.

Return to Sarajevo
On 2 September 2021, Kapić returned to Sarajevo, signing a two-year contract. He made his second debut for Sarajevo on 10 September, in a league game against Velež Mostar. On 17 October 2021, Kapić scored the only goal in Sarajevo's 1–0 league victory at home to Posušje.

Career statistics

Club

Honours
Sheriff Tiraspol
Moldovan National Division: 2018, 2020–21

Sarajevo
Bosnian Premier League: 2018–19
Bosnian Cup: 2018–19

References

External links

1995 births
Living people
People from Cazin
Bosniaks of Bosnia and Herzegovina
Bosnia and Herzegovina Muslims
Association football midfielders
Bosnia and Herzegovina footballers
FK Varnsdorf players
ND Gorica players
Grasshopper Club Zürich players
FC Sheriff Tiraspol players
FK Sarajevo players
SC Paderborn 07 players
FC Kryvbas Kryvyi Rih players
Slovenian PrvaLiga players
Swiss Super League players
Moldovan Super Liga players
Ukrainian Premier League players
Premier League of Bosnia and Herzegovina players
Bosnia and Herzegovina expatriate footballers
Expatriate footballers in Croatia
Bosnia and Herzegovina expatriate sportspeople in Croatia
Expatriate footballers in the Czech Republic
Bosnia and Herzegovina expatriate sportspeople in the Czech Republic
Expatriate footballers in Slovenia
Bosnia and Herzegovina expatriate sportspeople in Slovenia
Expatriate footballers in Switzerland
Bosnia and Herzegovina expatriate sportspeople in Switzerland
Expatriate footballers in Moldova
Bosnia and Herzegovina expatriate sportspeople in Moldova
Expatriate footballers in Germany
Bosnia and Herzegovina expatriate sportspeople in Germany
Expatriate footballers in Ukraine
Bosnia and Herzegovina expatriate sportspeople in Ukraine